Tommy Hedden (born May 1973 in Auburn, California, U.S.) is a professional speedway rider in the United States. He represented USA in the 2007 Speedway World Cup.

He was also a member of the 2007 USA Dream Team tour to the UK.

Career honours 
 Speedway World Cup
 2007 - 4th in Semi-Final 2 (0 points)
 2008 - 4th in Qualifying Round 1 (1 point)
 2010 - 3rd in Qualifying Round 2 (2 point)

See also 
 United States national speedway team

References

External links 
 USA Dream Team website

1973 births
Living people
American speedway riders
People from Auburn, California